North Vancouver may refer to:

North Vancouver (city), a city in British Columbia, Canada
North Vancouver (district municipality), a district municipality in British Columbia, Canada
North Vancouver (electoral district), a federal electoral district in British Columbia, Canada
North Vancouver (provincial electoral district), a provincial electoral district in British Columbia, Canada
North Vancouver station, a seasonal tourist railway station

See also 
North Shore (Greater Vancouver), which encompasses the city and the district as well as West Vancouver
North Vancouver School District
Vancouver (disambiguation)
Vancouver (electoral districts)